Paolo Costa may refer to:

 Paolo Costa (poet)
 Paolo Costa (politician)

See also 

 Paulo Costa (disambiguation)